Tenerus is a genus of checkered beetles in the subfamily Enopliinae.

Species 
Tenerus curticollis - Tenerus cyaneus - Tenerus femoralis - Tenerus flavicollis - Tenerus formosanus - Tenerus hilleri - Tenerus javanus - Tenerus lewisi - Tenerus melanurus - Tenerus parryanus - Tenerus praeustus - Tenerus proximus - Tenerus quadrimaculatus - Tenerus savioi - Tenerus signaticollis - Tenerus viridipennis

References

External links 
 

Enopliinae
Cleridae genera